This article lists the solo discography of American guitarist Ted Nugent.

Albums

Studio albums

Notes

Live albums

Compilation albums

Singles
This section includes only singles that were released in the U.S. and Canada.

References

External links

Rock music discographies
Discographies of American artists
Discography